Rauch is a town in Buenos Aires Province, Argentina. It is the administrative headquarters for Rauch Partido.

In 1829, the "combate de Las Vizcacheras" (part of the Argentine Civil War) was fought in Rauch.

External links

 Municipal website

Populated places in Buenos Aires Province
Populated places established in 1865